The Harmony Skirmish was a small engagement of the American Civil War between Confederate forces under Colonel John Mosby and Union forces under Colonel Marcus Reno on March 21, 1865, near the village of Harmony (present day Hamilton) in Loudoun County, Virginia.  A union raiding party, that was sent into Loudoun County to eliminate Confederate partisans, was ambushed by Mosby's Rangers near the village of Harmony.  After inflicting light casualties on the Federals, the Rangers were unable to drive off the numerically superior and better equipped force and were compelled to withdraw.  The skirmish, which was the last major action of the war within Loudoun, was tactically inconclusive.

Background
On the afternoon of March 20 Col. Reno, commanding a 1000-man expedition, consisting of the Loudoun Rangers, 12th Pennsylvania Cavalry, 1st United States Infantry and 2 pieces of light artillery, set out from Harpers Ferry into Loudoun County on a mission to obtain forage and clear the Loudoun Valley of partisans.  The column entered Loudoun in the Between the Hills valley and marched through Hillsboro and Woodgrove, reaching Purcellville on the morning of the 21st. The column was under near continuous sniping fire from Confederate partisans during the march, 5 of which were captured at Hillsboro.

The Federal incursion did not go unnoticed by John Mosby's scouts and accordingly he ordered a rendezvous of his Rangers the following morning.  On the 21st Mosby, with 128 Rangers, set out north from upper Fauquier to confront the Federals.

The Skirmish
He deployed the main body of his force in a woods south of the road while leaving 24 Rangers under Jim Wiltshire on the road as bait for an ambush. The 12th Pennsylvania soon came upon the Wiltshires men, and taking them to be an isolated band of partisans of the nature that the Federals had been fighting with since entering Loudoun, immediately charged. Wiltshire's force broke into retreat until they reached the woods where the rest of the Rangers were concealed, at which point they suddenly turned around and counter-attacked the Federals. At the same time the rest of the Rangers came out of the woods and assailed the Federal flank. The 12th Pennsylvania briefly made a stand but was soon compelled to retreat.

The Rangers broke after them, but as they reached Harmony they encountered the Federal infantry who were concealed behind a hedgerow.  The infantry met the Rangers with a fierce volley that wounded and killed several and forced most of the rest to fall back.  A few daring Rangers pursued the Federals further, including James Sinclair, who after killing one Federal, saw he wore a diamond ring.  In the midst of the fight Sinclair jumped from his horse to pull the ring from the body, when it would not budge he cut the finger off.  Mosby soon called off the Rangers and fell back towards Fauquier.  He would continue to shadow the Federals as they ranged through Loudoun and Fauquier for the next 3 days, though no significant fighting between the two took place.

Results
In the brief fight the Rangers killed 9 Federals, wounded 20 and took 5 prisoners while suffering 2 killed 5 wounded and 4 captured, including Ranger John Chew, who was paralyzed by gunfire in the fight and left behind when the Rangers fell back.  The fight did little to deter the Federal incursion, nor did the Rangers inflict the severe casualties that was a characteristic of most of their raids, but the engagement is significant in that it represents the last fight of any size in the county.

References
Wert, Jeffry D. Mosby's Rangers. Simon & Schuster Paperbacks; New York, Ny. 1990. 
Goodheart, Briscoe. History of the Independent Loudoun Rangers, Scouts U.S Army: 1862-1865.

Battles of the Eastern Theater of the American Civil War
Inconclusive battles of the American Civil War
Battles of the American Civil War in Virginia
Loudoun County in the American Civil War
Operations of the 43rd Virginia Cavalry Battalion
1865 in the American Civil War
March 1865 events